The Martinez Canyon Rock House, which is also known as Jack Miller's Cabin is a Stone cabin located deep within the Santa Rosa Mountains Wilderness Area. The Cabin is a two-room vernacular style dwelling built sometime in
the 1930s. The homestead/miners camp is constructed of cement with a facade of local river rock. In
1999, the Martinez Canyon Rockhouse was listed on the National Register of Historic Places. the Nearest Modern-day Towns are on the West Pinyon Pines (10 Miles) and on the east Valerie (9.8 Miles)

History
The Martinez Canyon Rockhouse, also known as Jack
Millers Cabin, is a two-room vernacular style dwelling built
approximately in 1930. The Martinez Canyon stream passes by the
cabin about seventy (70) feet to the south and also passes east of
the cabin since at this juncture the stream turns from south to an
easterly direction. At this point the stream supports huge
cottonwood trees. Except in the very driest of years, this stream
sufficiently supplies the cabin with fresh water the year round.
The cabin is situated on a low bench that is relatively level and
which supports the remnants of a small garden behind and east of
the cabin. No vegetal materials remain in the garden which might
allow us to identify what crops had been planted. Throughout the
garden and portions of the surrounding cabin yard are prehistoric
remains of chipped stone debitage and Tizon Brown pottery. One
granitic bedrock outcrop supports a metate. A shovel test probe in
the garden revealed about 10 cm of mostly intact subsurface
deposition. Based upon surface artifacts, the site dates to the
late prehistoric period. The archaeological component is not
considered a contributing element.

Construction
This two room homestead/miners camp is constructed of cement with
a facade of local river rock. The cabin walls are constructed of
thirteen (13) 4" X 8" cement lifts (forms) . The cement forms which
run the length of the walls have a high content of local small
river rock. The outside ornamental river rocks average four to six
inches in diameter and were placed with mortar while the interior
cement forms were sill drying. The outside rocks therefore also
serve to stabilize the walls.
At a point three (3) concrete forms, approximately 16", below the
ceiling, the walls are braced with true 2" X 4" beams. At the top
of the highest form there are eleven (11) 2" X 4" beams which have
been laid parallel to the support beams. These run north–south
across the narrow span. The ceiling is constructed of 1" X 6"
tongue and groove planks laid across the 2" X 4" beams and covered
with tar paper. The seams and edges were sealed with hot tar.
Over the tar paper has been laid galvanized tin siding. This form
of roof construction forms a flat roof with the cement walls
extending above the roof approximately six (6) inches. For the
purposes of roof drainage, four inch diameter -tin pipe have been
extended from the roof through the cement and rock wall.

After the walls were poured, the floor was poured in segments.
These cement floor segments vary in size, with portions of the slab
floor supported to the east by either lumber, rock, or concrete
footings. It was impossible to determine what exactly was used as
supports since no view of the underside of the floor is possible.
These supports, of whatever material, were necessary due to the
asymmetrical surface of the ground.
The cabin sports six (6) wooden framed windows and two fireplaces.
A river rock fireplace is located on the north wall in the main
room and a much smaller fireplace is in the kitchen. The front
door and side doors, as well as the window frames, have been
transported from town since they are of a mercantile grade.
On the south (front) of the house is a wide dirt, open level
surface which measures 5' by 35' and is outlined with rocks.
Leading down from this area are seven small boulders positioned as
steps. Constructed at the bottom, some 20 feet below are to posts
connected by an old wire which was used to tether mules or burros .
Fifty feet southwest of the house is an historic period rock and
earthen oven or "hornito". Forty feet west of the house stands a
cement and rock forge which may also have been used as a smelter,
judging by the associated ladle and smelting equipment nearby.
These associated activity areas date from the same period as the
cabin.
The property is in overall excellent condition and has had minimal
attention since its construction, about 1930. The setting has
changed little and the environment and structures reflect the
individual miner and his residence and occupation during the early
20th century.

Hiking Trail
Apparently, Jack Miller built a road up the canyon, back in the day, but it washed out in a big flood in 1976. Now Access to the "Martinez Canyon Trail" trailhead starts at Van Buren and 68th Ave. into the base of the canyon. It is a 20 Mile out-and-back Trail following a stream into eventually reaching the stone cabin, along the trail there are ancient Cahuilla Village remains. Inside the Cabin Hikers who make the voyage leave their names on a Paper sheet inside the structure and sometimes may camp inside where two beds remain.

Historic designations

In January 1991 began the process

See also
Santa Rosa Mountains

References

External links

Houses completed in 1930
California Historical Landmarks
Houses on the National Register of Historic Places in California
1930 in California